Vilho Pekka Suosalo (17 May 1910, Jakobstad - 27 July 1976) was a Finnish bricklayer and politician. He was a member of the Parliament of Finland from 1962 to 1966, representing the Finnish People's Democratic League (SKDL). Kalle Suosalo was his father.

References

1910 births
1976 deaths
People from Jakobstad
People from Vaasa Province (Grand Duchy of Finland)
Finnish People's Democratic League politicians
Members of the Parliament of Finland (1962–66)